Jeanfield Swifts Football Club are a Scottish football club based in Perth. Their home ground is Riverside Stadium, located in the North Muirton area of the city, to which they moved in 2006 from Simpson Park, where they had been plagued by fires and vandalism.

History

Up until the end of the 2005–06 season, they played in Tayside Division One in the Scottish Junior Football Association's East Region, and they won the championship in the division's final season. The SJFA restructured prior to the 2006–07 season, and Swifts found themselves in the twelve-team East Region Central Division. They finished in seventh place in their first season in the division. After a further five seasons in the division, they were promoted to the East Region Premier League as champions in 2011–12. In 2015–16, they were promoted as champions to the Superleague for the first time. They finished 13th and 14th in their two seasons in the Superleague.

Prior to the 2018–19 campaign, Swifts were admitted into the East of Scotland Football League. They finished third in Conference C and were promoted to the new 16-team Premier Division, after the league reverted to a two-tier system.

They became full members of the Scottish Football Association in June 2019, having applied in November 2018.

They are currently under the charge of manager Ross Gunnion, who took over in the summer of 2015. He is assisted by Logan McConachie, Daryn Smith, Dan Curnyn, Michael Dott and goalkeeping coach Scott Cummings.

Coaching staff

League history since 1990

Honours

League
Tayside Premier Division winners: 1972–73
Tayside Division One winners: 1976–77, 1984–85, 1995–96, 1999–00
Tayside District Division One winners: 2005–06
East Region Central Division winners: 2011–12
East Region Premier League winners: 2015–16
Midland Junior League: 1943–44, 1945–46, 1946–47
Perthshire Junior League winners: 1941–42, 1947–48, 1948–49, 1963–64, 1965–66, 1966–67, 1967–68, 1968–69

Cup
Currie (Findlay & Co) Cup: 1940–41, 1943–44, 1944–45, 1947–48, 1948–49, 1950–51, 1966–67, 1987–88
Intersport Cup: 1987–88, 1995–96
Division One (Downfield SC) Cup: 2001–02
Perth Advertiser (PA) Cup: 1940–41, 1941–42, 1942–43, 1944–45, 1945–46, 1946–47, 1947–48, 1966–67, 1968–69, 1970–71, 1991–92
Division One (Red House Hotel) Cup: 2004–05
Tayside Drybrough Cup: 1976–77
Perthshire Junior Consolation Cup: 1942–43, 1943–44, 1944–45, 1945–46, 1949–50, 1963–64, 1966–67, 1967–68, 1968–69
Laing Cup: 1943–44
Craig Stephen Cup: 1975–76, 1976–77, 1978–79, 1981–82
Perthshire Junior Charity Cup: 1940–41, 1941–42
Perthshire Junior Cup: 1942–43, 1943–44, 1944–45, 1945–46, 1946–47, 1947–48, 1954–55, 1964–65, 1965–66, 1972–73
Perthshire Rosebowl: 1948–49, 1949–50, 1958–59, 1959–60, 1961–62, 1966–67, 1967–68
North and Tayside Inter-Regional Cup (GA Cup): 2011–2012, 2012–13
ACA Sports League Cup: 2012–13

References

External links
Club website

 
Football clubs in Scotland
Scottish Junior Football Association clubs
Association football clubs established in 1928
Sport in Perth, Scotland
Football clubs in Perth and Kinross
1928 establishments in Scotland
East of Scotland Football League teams